

Salvador Allende (1908–1973) was the president of Chile from 1970 until 1973.

Allende may also refer to:

People with the surname 
Allende (surname)
Ignacio Allende (1769–1811), Mexican caudillo during the Mexican War of Independence
Isabel Allende (1942–), Chilean author

Places in Mexico
Allende Municipality, Chihuahua
Allende, Coahuila
Allende Municipality, Coahuila
Allende, Guanajuato
Allende, Nuevo León

Other uses
Allende (meteorite), a meteorite fall of 1969 in Chihuahua, Mexico
Allende (spider), a genus of spiders
Allende family, a Chilean family of Spanish descent
Allende metro station, in Mexico City, Mexico
Instituto Allende, an art college in San Miguel de Allende, Mexico
Allender, a surname